The Pulayar  (also Pulaya, Pulayas, Cherumar, Cheramar, and Cheraman) is a caste group mostly found in the southern part of India, forming one of the main social groups in modern-day Kerala, Karnataka and historically in Tamil Nadu.

Traditions 
Pulayars are noted for their music, craftsmanship, and for certain dances which include Kōlam-thullal, a mask dance which is part of their exorcism rituals, as well as the Mudi-āttam or hair-dance which has its origins in a fertility ritual. The folk dance Chozhikali is performed by the Pulayar community of central Kerala.

Demography 
According to the 2011 Census, the Pulayan population in Kerala was 1,338,008. They are a Scheduled Caste under India's reservation system in the state of Kerala and Tamil Nadu.

Notable people 
 Nandanar, a Nayanar saint, venerated in the Hindu sect of Shaivism
 Ayyankali (1863–1941), social reformer
 K. P. Vallon (1894–1940), social reformer
 P. K. Rosy (1903–1988), first heroine of the Malayalam film industry
 Dakshayani Velayudhan (1912–1978), former member of the Constituent Assembly
 Punnala Sreekumar, general secretary of Kerala Pulayar Maha Sabha (KPMS)
 K. G. Balakrishnan, 37th Chief Justice of India
 C. T. Ravikumar, judge of the Supreme Court of India
 Kodikunnel Suresh,  member of Parliament
 Chittayam Gopakumar, deputy speaker of 14th Kerala legislative assembly
 Dharmajan Bolgatty, Indian actor

See also 
 Caste system in Kerala

Arts of Pulayar caste:
 Chimmanakali
 Mangalamkali

References 

Scheduled Castes of Kerala
Malayali people
Telugu society
Scheduled Castes of Tamil Nadu
Social groups of Karnataka